While the Door Was Locked (Swedish:Medan porten var stängd) is a 1946 Swedish drama film directed by Hasse Ekman.

Plot summary
In an apartment building at an address in Östermalm, Stockholm the residents and their guests each play their part in a night full of drama, while the door is locked.

Cast
Tollie Zellman as Cora Anker, actress
Olof Winnerstrand as Hugo Sjöwall
Inga Landgré as Birgit Ström 
Marianne Löfgren as fröken Bojan Olsson, prostitute  
Hasse Ekman as Torsten "Totte" von Breda, Captain
Gunn Wållgren as Marianne Sahlén, flight attendant
Gunnar Björnstrand as Erik Sahlén
Gösta Cederlund as Karl-Otto Rosander 
Nils Kihlberg as Anders Holmkvist 
Hjördis Petterson as Frida Johansson, the porter's wife 
Douglas Håge as Emil Johansson, the porter
Hampe Faustman as Tomas Ekberg, journalist 
Stig Järrel as Bojan's customer 
Tord Stål as Kastgren, police
Gunnar Öhlund as Erlandson, police

External links

1946 films
1946 drama films
Films directed by Hasse Ekman
Swedish drama films
1940s Swedish-language films
Swedish black-and-white films
1940s Swedish films